Tipulamima ivondro is a moth of the family Sesiidae. It is known from Madagascar.

This species has a wingspan of 31 mm, with a length of the forewings of 14 mm. The forewings are almost completely hyaline (glass like), with the cell a little yellowish. The edge and a narrow transversal line of the forewings are blackish. The hindewings are hyaline with a little yellowish touch in the cell.

The holotype was collected by A.Seyrig north of Fort-Dauphin, in south-eastern Madagascar.

References

Sesiidae
Moths described in 1955
Moths of Madagascar
Moths of Africa